Anselmo Puente is a Mexican former tennis player.

Puente, the men's singles champion at the 1946 Central American and Caribbean Games, made one Davis Cup appearance for Mexico, an America Zone semi-final against Cuba in Havana in 1950. He played in the opening singles rubber, which he won over Juan Weiss in five sets.

At the 1951 Pan American Games in Buenos Aires, Puente teamed up with Gustavo Palafox to win a bronze medal in the men's doubles. He also represented Mexico at the 1955 Pan American Games.

In 1952 he was one of a record seven Mexicans to enter into the main draw of the U.S. National Championships. He fell in the first round to local player William Cranston, in what would be his only grand slam main draw appearance.

See also
List of Mexico Davis Cup team representatives

References

External links
 
 
 

Year of birth missing (living people)
Living people
Mexican male tennis players
Pan American Games medalists in tennis
Pan American Games bronze medalists for Mexico
Tennis players at the 1951 Pan American Games
Tennis players at the 1955 Pan American Games
Central American and Caribbean Games medalists in tennis
Central American and Caribbean Games gold medalists for Mexico
Central American and Caribbean Games silver medalists for Mexico
Central American and Caribbean Games bronze medalists for Mexico
Competitors at the 1946 Central American and Caribbean Games
Competitors at the 1954 Central American and Caribbean Games
Medalists at the 1951 Pan American Games
20th-century Mexican people